The men's Greco-Roman heavyweight competition at the 1960 Summer Olympics in Rome took place from August 26 to 31 at the Basilica of Maxentius. Nations were limited to one competitor.

Competition format

This Greco-Roman wrestling competition continued to use the "bad points" elimination system introduced at the 1928 Summer Olympics for Greco-Roman and at the 1932 Summer Olympics for freestyle wrestling, though adjusted the point values slightly. Wins by fall continued to be worth zero points and wins by decision continued to be worth one point. Losses by fall, however, were now worth four points (up from three). Losses by decision were worth three points (consistent with most prior years, though in some losses by split decision had been worth only two points). Ties were now allowed, worth two points for each wrestler. The elimination threshold was also increased from five points to six points. The medal round concept, used in 1952 and 1956 requiring a round-robin amongst the medalists even if one or more finished a round with enough points for elimination, was used only if exactly three wrestlers remained after a round—if two competitors remained, they faced off head-to-head; if only one, he was the gold medalist.

Results

Round 1

 Bouts

 Points

Round 2

 Bouts

 Points

Round 3

 Bouts

 Points

Round 4

Kubát, Bohdan, and Dietrich all remained uneliminated after this round (none having six or more points), but the three wrestlers had all faced each other—with ties between Bohdan and Dietrich in round 2, Dietrich and Kubát in round 3, and Kubát and Bohdan in this round. No more bouts were therefore possible, and the competition ended. Bohdan had the fewest points, at four, and therefore took the gold medal. Dietrich and Kubát were tied at five points, and had drawn their head-to-head bout. The tie was therefore broken by body weight, with Dietrich (the lighter man) winning the silver medal.

Kozma's victory over Sosnowski in this round also functioned as the tie-breaker between the two wrestlers for 4th place.

 Bouts

 Points

References

Wrestling at the 1960 Summer Olympics